Ctenucha clavia is a moth of the family Erebidae. It was described by Herbert Druce in 1883. It lives in Ecuador.

References

clavia
Moths described in 1883